Township 2 is a township in Rooks County, Kansas, United States.

History
Rooks County was established with four townships: Bow Creek, Lowell, Paradise and Stockton. That number increased to seven by 1878 and twenty three in 1925. The twenty three townships were in place until 1971 when the number was reduced to the current twelve townships.

Township 2 was formed from Rooks County townships Greenfield, Iowa and Lanark in 1971 pursuant to Kansas Statute 80-1110. 80-1110 allowed for the disorganization of townships and assigning those territories to contiguous townships.

Elm Creek flows through the southern part of Township 2 into South Fork Solomon River. Jim Creek and Douglas Creek flow through the northern part of Township 2 into South Fork Solomon River.

Greenfield Township
Greenfield Township was created from parts of Lowell and Stockton townships in 1879. The east half from Lowell, the west half from Stockton.

Iowa Township
Iowa Township was created from parts of Lowell and Stockton townships in 1879. The east half from Lowell, the west half from Stockton.

Lanark Township
Lanark Township was created from part of Farmington Township in 1879. Farmington had been created a year earlier from Bow Creek and Lowell townships. Lanark was named for Lanarkshire, Scotland, the birthplace of an early settler in the territory.

References

Townships in Rooks County, Kansas
Townships in Kansas